Christiana Lund is a Grammy-winning American singer. A Capella Kids was the album, released in 1991, produced by Barney Robertson. She sang background vocals for Waylon Jenning's Cowboys, Sisters, Rascals, and Dirt, also produced by Robertson.

Shorty 101 

She was in the pop group, Shorty 101.  Other members were Emily Frlekin, Stephanie Frlekin, and Blythe Hensley. Wade Robson choreographed a video for the group.

Personal life 

She is married to Doug Robb, the lead singer of the band Hoobastank.

References
 CBS News, 2005  Retrieved 4 June 2008
 New York Times, 2001  Retrieved 4 June 2008

American women singers
Living people
Year of birth missing (living people)
Place of birth missing (living people)
21st-century American women